The Field Elm cultivar  Ulmus minor 'Concavaefolia' was briefly described by Loudon in Arboretum et Fruticetum Britannicum (1838), as Ulmus campestris var. concavaefolia. A fuller description followed in Petzold and Kirchner 's Arboretum Muscaviense (1864). Henry noted that Loudon's "insufficiently described" U. campestris var. concavaefolia seemed to be identical with the field elm cultivar 'Webbiana', a view repeated by Krüssmann.

Description
Loudon thought the tree resembled his 'Cucullata' (probably the cultivar later called Ulmus montana cucullata Hort.). Petzold and Kirchner in Arboretum Muscaviense (1864) described the leaves of their Ulmus campestris concavaefolia, as short and rounded, dark green above and whitish green below, "more or less concave", that is, curling upwards at the edges so that the pale underside is more prominent than the darker upper (a description, as Henry noted, that matches 'Webbiana'). They noted that the leaves of their var. concavaefolia were smaller than those of their var. cucullata (again, probably Ulmus montana cucullata Hort.), but not dissimilar in shape.

Cultivation
If synonymous with 'Webbiana', 'Concavaefolia' is rare but remains in cultivation. No other field elms labelled var. concavaefolia are known, either in herbarium specimens or in cultivation (but see 'Convex-leaved field elms' below).

Synonymy
? U. campestris viscosa Hort.: Petzold and Kirchner (1864)
? U. nitens var. Webbiana: Henry (1913)

Convex-leaved field elms
A young, fastigiate, suckering, convex-leaved U. minor cultivar (concave from the underside), stood in the yard of St James's Church, Constitution Street, Leith, till 2017, where an 1882 print showed a narrow elm-like tree, probably the original planting. Its sucker regrowth remains. A second similar convex-leaved suckering field elm stands in East Fettes Avenue, Edinburgh. The leaves of both resemble those of sweet basil, unlike Petzold and Kirchner's var. concavaefolia (probably 'Webbiana'). 

For a convex-leaved field elm with a more elongated, rather hooded leaf, distributed erroneously by the Späth nursery of Berlin for a short time in the early 20th century as Ulmus racemosa, in cultivation in Brighton and Edinburgh, see 'Cucullata'. No cultivar names are known for convex-leaved field elms.

References

Field elm cultivar
Ulmus articles missing images
Ulmus
Missing elm cultivars